Zoe Smith is an English weightlifter.

Zoe Smith may also refer to:

Zoe Smith (badminton), see U.S. National Badminton Championships
Zoe Tuckwell-Smith, Australian actress